The Kingdom may refer to:

Places
The Kingdom, a nickname for County Kerry in Ireland
The Kingdom, a nickname for Fife in Scotland
The Kingdom of Saudi Arabia

Arts, entertainment, and media

Literature
 The Kingdom, a 2014 book by Emmanuel Carrère
 The Kingdom (novel), a 2011 novel by Clive Cussler and Grant Blackwood
The Kingdom, history of Saudi Arabia by Robert Lacey

Music
 The Kingdom (Starfield album), a 2012 album by Starfield
 The Kingdom (Bush album), a 2020 album by British rock band Bush
 The Kingdom (Elgar), an oratorio by Edward Elgar composed in 1906

Media

Television
 The Kingdom (miniseries), a Danish television miniseries by Lars von Trier

Other uses in arts, entertainment, and media
 The Kingdom (comics), a DC Comics story and comic book limited series
 The Kingdom (film), a 2007 action thriller film set in Saudi Arabia
The Kingdom, a settlement in The Walking Dead

Other uses
 The Kingdom (professional wrestling), a pro wrestling tag team and stable
The Kingdom, an apocalyptic Christian movement founded by Frank Sandford

See also
King (disambiguation)
Kingdom (disambiguation)
Kingdom Come (disambiguation)